Jean André (1916–1980) was a French art director, active as a production designer in French cinema.
es:
Jean André (director de arte)

Selected filmography
 Elena and Her Men (1956)
 And God Created Woman (1956)
 Toi... le venin (1958)
 The Ravishing Idiot (1964)
 La Grande Vadrouille (1966)
 The Game Is Over (1966)
 Darling Caroline (1968)
 Don Juan, or If Don Juan Were a Woman (1973)
 Someone Is Bleeding (1974)
 On aura tout vu (1976)
 Violette & François (1977)
 La Carapate (1978)
 The Umbrella Coup (1980)

References

Bibliography 
 Slide, Anthony. Fifty Classic French Films, 1912-1982: A Pictorial Record. Dover Publications, 1987.

External links 
 

1916 births
1980 deaths
French art directors
Film people from Paris